Chulluncane (possibly from Aymara chullunkhä ('ä' stands for a long 'a') icicle, -ni a suffix, "the one with icicles") is a mountain in the Andes of Peru which reaches a height of approximately . It is located in the Tacna Region, Tacna Province, Palca District.

References 

Mountains of Tacna Region
Mountains of Peru